Rakshann Readdi (born 29 September 2000) is an Indian cricketer. He made his Twenty20 debut on 16 January 2021, for Hyderabad in the 2020–21 Syed Mushtaq Ali Trophy. He made his List A debut on 26 February 2021, for Hyderabad in the 2020–21 Vijay Hazare Trophy. He made his first-class debut on 17 February 2022, for Hyderabad in the 2021–22 Ranji Trophy.

References

External links
 

2000 births
Living people
Indian cricketers
Hyderabad cricketers
Place of birth missing (living people)